Gömmece is a village in Tarsus district of Mersin Province, Turkey. The population of village was 171  as of 2012.

References

Villages in Tarsus District